Heat and Mass Transfer is a peer-reviewed scientific journal published by Springer. It serves the circulation of new developments in the field of basic research of heat and mass transfer phenomena, as well as related material properties and their measurements. Thereby applications to engineering problems are promoted. The journal publishes original research reports.

As of 1995 the title Wärme- und Stoffübertragung was changed to Heat and Mass Transfer.

Indexing 
Among others, the journal is indexed in Google Scholar, INIS Atomindex, Journal Citation Reports/Science Edition, OCLC, PASCAL, Science Citation Index, Science Citation Index Expanded (SciSearch) and Scopus.

External links 
Heat and Mass Transfer

Energy and fuel journals
Engineering journals
English-language journals
Monthly journals
Springer Science+Business Media academic journals